Brother's Keeper is an American television sitcom that ran for one season on ABC from September 25, 1998 to May 14, 1999. Created by Donald Todd, the series chronicles the rocky coexistence of Porter Waide (William Ragsdale) and his irresponsible pro-football player brother Bobby Waide (Sean O'Bryan), who is contractually forced to move into his brother's house, where Bobby's lifestyle often clashes with that of Porter's, and becomes an unwitting second parent to Porter's son Oscar (Justin Cooper).

Premise
The series centers around Porter Waide (Ragsdale), a milquetoast college history professor and widowed single father, raising his son, Oscar (Cooper), by himself until his brother, Bobby (O'Bryan), a football placekicker who had just been signed to play with the San Francisco 49ers and has a reputation for being a bad boy, moves in with his brother and nephew, as part of a stipulation in his new multimillion-dollar contract in which Bobby has to live with someone who is more responsible than him, in order to change his troublemaking ways.

This situation proves incredibly challenging as Bobby continues to exhibit childish behavior in his adult years, which often aggravates Porter, as well as Bobby's smart, sarcastic and harried sports agent Dena Draeger (Bess Meyer), who has the unenviable task of "babysitting" Bobby to ensure he stays out of trouble and keep him from violating the terms of his new NFL contract. Although Porter is reluctant to let Bobby stay with him and his son, he realizes that Oscar is thrilled with the fact that he now gets to spend time with his famous uncle, with Bobby becoming an unlikely second parent to his nephew and making attempts to try to get his brother to have fun and loosen up, while Porter tries teaching Bobby how to be a responsible person.

Toward the end of the series, Porter wrestles with his burgeoning romantic feelings for Dena.  Although it's implied that Dena partially reciprocates Porter's affection, the series is canceled before their relationship can advance.

Cast

Main
 William Ragsdale – Porter Waide
 Sean O'Bryan – Bobby Waide
 Justin Cooper – Oscar Arthur Waide
 Bess Meyer – Dena Draeger

Recurring
 Natasha Slayton – Rose
 Kate Hodge – Marilyn

Special guests
Elizabeth Berkley (as Amy; episode: "You Are Me")
Dan Dierdorf (as himself; episode: "Kick Ball, Get Check")
Illeana Douglas (as Ginny; episode: "Dating the Teacher")
Boomer Esiason (as himself; episode: "Kick Ball, Get Check")
John Michael Higgins (as Mark; episodes: "Trick or Treat?", "The Note", "Politically Impolite")
Henry Kissinger (as himself; episode: "Politically Impolite")
Jack Klugman (as Jack; episode: "An Odd Couple of Days")
Piper Laurie (as Jane Waide; episode: "Everybody Says I Love You")
Bill Maher (as himself; episode: "Politically Impolite")
Karl Malone (as himself; episode: "You're in Trouble")
Al Michaels (as himself; episode: "Kick Ball, Get Check")
Heather Nauert (as herself; episode: "Politically Impolite")
Tony Randall (as Tony; episode: "An Odd Couple of Days")
Bobby Slayton (as himself; episode: "Politically Impolite")

Episodes

Production
Brother's Keeper was produced by Axelrod-Widdoes Entertainment and Donald Todd Productions in association with Studios USA Television. Show creator Donald Todd served as the executive producer and showrunner of the series, alongside non-writing executive producers Jonathan Axelrod and James Widdoes (the latter of whom had also directed fifteen of the series' 23 episodes, including the pilot episode and the final episode of the first season, that effectively became the show's series finale, "The Duel").

Broadcast
The series aired as part of ABC's TGIF comedy lineup on Friday evenings; despite this, some of the show's episodes featured decidedly more adult humor than the rest of the TGIF lineup, which otherwise targeted pre-teens and teenagers (though like most family sitcoms aired on TGIF, Brother's Keeper incorporated humor that would appeal to both adult viewers as well as to the lineup's target audience); as such, the series was aired at 9:30 p.m. ET on Friday evenings and was one of two freshman series added to the block that season, along with the Mary-Kate and Ashley Olsen starring vehicle Two of a Kind (both series were joined by veteran TGIF shows Boy Meets World and Sabrina, the Teenage Witch).

Online streaming
Since October 12, 2007, 22 of the series' 23 episodes (excluding the show's ninth episode "The Boss of Me") are available through Hulu though its distribution agreement with part-owner NBCUniversal (one of the show's production companies, Studios USA, was absorbed into Universal Television after NBCUniversal predecessor company Vivendi Universal acquired USA Networks' film and television assets in 2002; NBCUniversal Television Distribution currently handles the series' domestic and international distribution rights).

The series is among a handful of program titles (both ongoing and discontinued television series with complete seasons) that do not require a subscription to the Hulu Plus service to access all of the episodes online, though a Hulu Plus subscription is required to view the episodes on internet-enabled television sets and mobile devices.

Reception

Ratings
Despite respectable ratings, often winning the 9:30 p.m. timeslot in most demographics and averaging 10.7 million total viewers during its run (finishing the 1998-99 season #62 out of 155 primetime shows, tied with the CBS newsmagazine 48 Hours, according to Nielsen Media Research), the series was cancelled by ABC in May 1999.

Awards

References

External links 
 

1998 American television series debuts
1999 American television series endings
1990s American sitcoms
American Broadcasting Company original programming
English-language television shows
Television series by Universal Television
Television shows set in San Francisco
TGIF (TV programming block)